Birch Hills County is a municipal district in north-western Alberta, Canada. It is located in Census Division 19, northeast of Grande Prairie.

The district takes its name from a range of hills of the same name, which in turn were named by Cree Indians.

History 
In January 2021, a helicopter crash happened in the county, in which a family of four were killed.

Geography

Communities and localities 
The following urban municipalities are surrounded by Birch Hills County.
Cities
none
Towns
none
Villages
none
Summer villages
none

The following hamlets are located within Birch Hills County.
Hamlets
Eaglesham
Peoria
Tangent
Wanham (dissolved from village status in 1999, location of municipal office)
Watino

The following localities are located within Birch Hills County.
Localities 
Belloy
Codesa
Heart Valley

Demographics 

In the 2016 Census of Population conducted by Statistics Canada, Birch Hills County had a population of 1,553 living in 496 of its 616 total private dwellings, a  change from its 2011 population of 1,582.

See also 
List of communities in Alberta
List of municipal districts in Alberta

References

External links 

 
Municipal districts in Alberta